Geoffrey Travers Mason (May 13, 1902 – January 5, 1987) was an American bobsledder who competed in the 1928 Winter Olympics.

Responding to a newspaper article in Paris, Mason was invited to join the Olympics. Then, nineteen days after seeing a bobsled for the first time, he won a gold medal as part of the victorious U.S. five-man team at the 1928 Winter Olympics in St. Moritz and came home with the American flag from the event.

Mason was born in Philadelphia, Pennsylvania and died in Rumford, Rhode Island.

References

External links
 Sports Illustrated article
 Bobsleigh five-man Olympic medalists for 1928
 DatabaseOlympics profile

1902 births
1987 deaths
Sportspeople from Philadelphia
American male bobsledders
Olympic gold medalists for the United States in bobsleigh
Medalists at the 1928 Winter Olympics
Bobsledders at the 1928 Winter Olympics